Bachata is a style of social dance from the Dominican Republic which is now danced all over the world. It is connected with bachata music.

Description

In partnering, the lead can decide whether to perform in open, semi-closed or closed position. Dance moves or step variety strongly depend on the music (such as the rhythms played by the different instruments), setting, mood, and interpretation. Unlike salsa, bachata dance does not usually include many turn patterns.

The basic dance sequence is performed in a full 8-count moving within a square, consisting of three steps and then a tap or various forms of step syncopations (such as the "double step"). The tap is done on the opposite foot of the last step, while the next step is taken on the same foot as the tap. The dance direction may change after the tap or fourth step. Bachata can be danced on any beat of the musical phrase as long as the basic dance sequence (three steps and then a tap \ syncopation) is maintained (for example, one may start on the 1st beat of the musical phrase, with the tap landing on the 4th beat).

History

From the late 1990s, dancers in the Western world started creating novel dance forms inspired by bachata music. The most well-known example of this is the made-up basic step commonly referred to as the "side-to-side step", which is sometimes accompanied by an exaggerated "pop” of the hips during the tap. These novel western dance forms were mostly created copying dance moves from other partner dances of various origins, Latin and non-Latin alike. Many such dances exist today, with the first of these often referred to as “Western side basic step”.

Often referred to in the West as "authentic / Dominican" bachata, the original social dance was created in the Dominican Republic during the 1960s and was danced only in closed position, like the bolero, often in a close embrace, often involving skin-to-skin belly-to-belly contact. Bachata basic steps are performed by moving within a small square (side, side, forward and then tap with your toes, then side, side, back and tap). This step was inspired by the bolero basic step, but evolved over time to include a tap and syncopations (steps in between the beats), helping dancers express the more dynamic music being commonly played. The hand placement can vary according to the position of the dances, which can range from very close to open to completely open.

Bachata is still danced today in the Caribbean and all over the world, and has been evolving for several decades. It is increasingly danced to faster music, adding more footwork, simple turns and rhythmic free-styling with alternation between close (romantic) and open position. Bachata is danced with soft hip movements and a tap or syncopation (1, 2, 3, tap/syncopation). It can also be danced with or without bouncing (moving the body up on the beats and down again in between the beats by adding slight spring to ones legs).

Variants

Western "traditional"
At some point in the late 1990s, dancers and dance-schools in the Western world began using a side to side pattern instead of the box-steps. The basic steps of this pattern move side to side, changing direction after every tap. Characteristics of this "early" dance school dance is the close connection between partners, soft hip movements, tap with a small "pop" of the hip on the 4th step (1, 2, 3, tap/hip) and does not include many turns/figures. Most of the styling in this dance is from ballroom dance and show moves like dips are commonly used. This was the first novel dance to bachata music that was popularized by dance schools outside the Dominican Republic.

Bachatango

Another dance was developed shortly after the western "traditional" and was called Bachatango. This is a fusion dance from Turin, Italy, consisting of short sequences taken from western "traditional" steps combined with different Tango steps and danced like tango. The "pop" count is used to add elaborated sensuality and varied Latin ballroom dance styles and also includes the characteristic kicks from tango. The turns are like in the "western traditional" dance. Although in the past this dance was  danced exclusively to bachata music, it has recently been danced to tango music as well. Even though bachatango is unheard of in the Dominican Republic, bachata's country of origin, the dance enjoyed a period of popularity among foreign dance instructors outside the Caribbean. Still, nowadays the dance is not often seen on the social dance floors.

Bachata fusion
A dance was developed mexico dancer Carlos Espinosa from around 2005 on the "western traditional" basic elements. The basics are the same as the "western traditional" dance, but with added dance elements and styling from brazilianzouk Salsa, tango and garifieira samba Ballroom. In this dance, couples typically move their torsos more and greatly exaggerate (especially the ladies). The most direct influence on the modern/moderna dance comes from the adoption of salsa turn patterns; these, together with dips became the core of the dance.

Sensual
The Sensual dance style was created in Cádiz, Andalusia, Spain, by Korke Escalona and Judith Cordero.

Korke learned the basics of western "traditional" in 1998, but with no more information than the basic step (four steps to the side) and inspired by bachata music, he started developing his own dance style inspired by soft  bachata songs of Juan Luis Guerra and natural "waving" movements in close position with a partner  and by understanding how the leader (traditionally a man) could lead the body of the follower (traditionally a lady) to interpret the music. The result is a novel, independent dance form with strict principles of leading and following, with mostly circular movements and body waves similar to Brazilian Zouk, and with isolations and dips when the dancers feel the music calls for it.

Korke is the creator of the BachataStars competition, in which participants get a random song and show ability to improvise, while showing their dance skills and musicality.

Ballroom style
Ballroom style is yet another dance developed in the West, primarily for dance competitions rather than social dancing, with very extreme hip movements and much ballroom dance styling. The basic step is based on western "traditional" dance.

Other styles
There are other Western dances, pioneered and promoted by different teachers around the world, each with its own distinct flair. Whether these are considered completely different styles or simply variations of the main styles above is often argued by teachers and students alike.

References

External links
 Basic Bachata dance steps with illustrative videos
 Website about authentic Bachata with detailed descriptions and illustrative videos
 Listing of Latin dance and Bachata dance festivals worldwide

 
Latin American folk dances
Latin dances
Dance in the Dominican Republic